The first recorded baseball event in Australia took place in Melbourne, Victoria in 1857, between teams from Collingwood and Richmond. Accounts vary as to the details, including whether it was a single game or a series of three games, though details in common include a score of 350–230 in favour of Collingwood, and that the rules used were some form of hybrid between cricket and baseball, with teams batting until all players were out, and runs being scored for every base crossed, rather than just for reaching home plate. Though there are no records to confirm it, the commonly held belief is that baseball in Australia originated on the Ballarat gold-fields among American miners. The Claxton Shield, the first annually recurring national tournament, commenced in 1934. Though the tournament itself has been supplanted at various points in its history, the physical Shield is still awarded to the national champions in the Australian Baseball League.

, 36 Australians have played in at least one MLB game. Of those players, 33 were born in Australia, the remainder having been born elsewhere but raised in Australia and have played for the Australia national baseball team at International Baseball Federation or sanctioned tournaments such as the Olympic Games and World Baseball Classic. 24 of the players have been pitchers and the other 12 have been position players.

Australia became the sixth country (not counting the United States) to have a player represented in the major leagues, when Joe Quinn made his debut on 26 April 1884 for the St. Louis Maroons. Quinn also became the first Australian-born manager, as a player-manager for the St. Louis Browns in 1895. After Quinn played his last MLB game, it was almost 85 years before another Australian would appear in an MLB game: Craig Shipley on 22 June 1986 for the Los Angeles Dodgers. The most recent Australian-born player to make his debut in the major leagues is Alexander Wells, who played for the Baltimore Orioles on 27 June 2021.

, Grant Balfour, David Nilsson and Liam Hendriks are the only Australians to have played in an MLB All-Star Game. In 2013, Balfour was added to the squad by AL manager Jim Leyland as a 'Sunday replacement' pitcher. In 1999, Nilsson was one of two players from the Milwaukee Brewers to be selected. At this time the starting lineup was selected by the fans through voting at stadiums and online. The remaining players were selected by the managers of the respective teams, themselves having been the managers of the league champions from the previous season: in Nilsson's case, he was selected by Bruce Bochy, who had managed the San Diego Padres to the 1998 World Series against the New York Yankees. Liam Hendriks became the third Australian to make the MLB All-Star Game in 2019, as a replacement for Charlie Morton.

Trent Durrington became the only Australian position player to pitch in an MLB game when he appeared for the Milwaukee Brewers on 17 April 2004 against the Houston Astros. Durrington had already entered the game initially as a pinch hitter and remained in the game playing at third base. With two outs in the bottom of the eighth inning, Durrington faced one hitter and induced a fly ball out.

Players 

Notes

Postseason appearances 

Joe Quinn became the first Australian to make an appearance in a postseason game for a Major League team, when the Boston Beaneaters met the Cleveland Spiders in a best-of-nine-game series between the season's first half and second half leaders. In 1892, the National League (NL) was the only active Major League, and Boston were already considered to be the NL pennant winners as they had the best record at the end of the season, and the series—won by the Beaneaters 5–0 (with one tie)—was considered an exhibition series.

In the modern era (considered to be from 1901 to today by MLB, as it was the first season with both of the current Major Leagues in operation), five Australians have played in postseason games, all of them pitchers. Graeme Lloyd became the first, playing with the New York Yankees in 1996. He made appearances against the Texas Rangers in the League Division Series, the Baltimore Orioles in the League Championship Series, and the Atlanta Braves in the World Series. Lloyd was credited with the win in game 4 of the 1996 World Series, becoming the first Australian player to do so, as well as becoming the first Australian to be a World Series champion when the Yankees won in 1996 and again in 1998.

Grant Balfour holds the record for most appearances in postseason games for an Australian, having played in a total of seventeen games, thirteen with the Tampa Bay Rays, two with the Minnesota Twins and two with the Oakland Athletics. Damian Moss and Peter Moylan also made postseason appearances, both having played for the Atlanta Braves against the San Francisco Giants: Moss in the 2002 National League Division Series, and Moylan in the 2010 National League Division Series. Liam Hendriks is the most recent Australian to play in the postseason, and the only such player to start a postseason game, pitching in the 2018 American League Wild Card Game for the Oakland Athletics.

See also 
List of countries with their first Major League Baseball player
List of Major League Baseball players who played in Australia
Major League Baseball Australia Academy Program

References

General sources
 
 

Baseball
Australia